Sweden has 12 peaks above 2000 metres in height.

Sweden, Highest elevation per historical province:

 
Sweden
Mountains
Sweden